Alocasia infernalis is a species of flowering plant in the family Araceae, native to Kalimantan, Indonesia and Sarawak state, Malaysia. It gets its specific epithet from its dark leaves—nearly black with purple veins—that exhibit a baleful red iridescence depending on the angle of the light and the position of the viewer. Occasionally kept as a houseplant, it has been nicknamed "Black Magic". Other names associated with Alocasia infernalis, which may represent incipient common names, or cultivars, include "Black Panther", 'Kapit', and 'Viery'.

References

infernalis
House plants
Endemic flora of Borneo
Flora of Sarawak
Plants described in 2007